IHE Delft Institute for Water Education is the largest international graduate water education facility in the world and is based in Delft, Netherlands. Delft is a world renowned knowledge centre on water infrastructure, technology and sciences, and attracts high-level students and scientists from around the globe. IHE Delft cooperates with Delft, the water knowledge city, and water related institutes based in Delft. The Institute confers fully accredited MSc degrees, and PhD degrees together with partners in the Netherlands. Since 1957 the Institute has provided graduate education to more than 23,000 water professionals from over 190 countries, and is a flagship institute in the UN-Water family.

Since its inception in 1957, the Institute has provided postgraduate education to numerous professionals (engineers and scientists) almost entirely from developing/transitional countries. It has also graduated over 100 PhD candidates and executed numerous research and capacity development projects throughout the world. Many of the alumni have reached senior positions in their home countries upon return, and remain key links in the global water network.

IHE Delft is a partner institute of the National SENSE Research School. As an accredited institution, staff and students are expected to follow the Netherlands Code of Conduct for Scientific Practice 

IHE Delft is instrumental in the strengthening of efforts by other universities and research centres in increasing the knowledge and skills of professionals working in the water sector. The Member States of UNESCO have access to the knowledge and services of IHE Delft in human and institutional capacity-building, which is vital to their efforts in the achievement Sustainable Development Goals, especially SDG 6 (providing access to clean water and sanitation).

IHE Delft carries out three types of activities that complement and reinforce each other in the broad field of water engineering, water management, environment, sanitation, and governance. Its core activities are education, research, and capacity building, with additional functions including:

Offering education, training, and research;
Providing capacity development services, particularly for developing countries, including promoting joint water governance arrangements through supporting water diplomacy;
Setting up and managing international networks of educational and water sector institutions and organizations;
Serving as a policy forum for UNESCO Member States and other stakeholders;
Providing professional expertise and advice on water education; and
Playing a leadership role in international standard setting for postgraduate water education programmes and continuing professional education.

Subjects taught at the institute:
 Coastal engineering and port development
 Hydroinformatics - modelling and information systems for water management
 Flood risk management
 Urban water engineering and management
 Sanitation

The institute was established from the International Course in Hydraulic Engineering (set up in 1957). This name changed to International Institute for Hydraulic and Environmental Engineering (IHE) in 1976. In 2003, the Institute changed its name to UNESCO-IHE Institute for Water Education (UNESCO-IHE). The name was changed again in 2017, this time to IHE Delft Institute for Water Education (IHE Delft) when its status in relation to UNESCO changed. It is now a Category 2 institute, operating under the auspices of UNESCO.

References

UNESCO
Research institutes in the Netherlands
Water organizations